Tala is a large suburban village 6 km north of Paphos, Cyprus. Many non-Cypriots (mostly British) have moved here permanently or have a summer home in Tala. Agios Neophytos Monastery is 1 km north. Is located 290 meters above sea level.  Tala receives an average annual rainfall of about 520 millimeters; grapevines (wine-making and table grape varieties), citrus fruits (orange trees, lemon trees), locust, olive, almond, and walnut trees, cereals, forage plants, vegetables, and a few banana trees are cultivated in the region. As far as stockbreeding is concerned, it is limited.

History
Tala is the ancestral village of the singer Cat Stevens. His father, Stavros Georgiou, was born here in 1900. Tala is the birthplace of Chrysostomos II of Cyprus, the former Archbishop of Cyprus.

In his book 'Historic Cyprus' (second edition 1947), Rupert Gunnis (at that time Inspector of Antiquities on the island) wrote:

Gallery

References

Communities in Paphos District